The Guelph Regals are a box lacrosse team from Guelph, Ontario, Canada.  The Regals play in the Ontario Junior B Lacrosse League.

History
The team was founded in 1992.

Season-by-season results
Note: GP = Games played, W = Wins, L = Losses, T = Ties, Pts = Points, GF = Goals for, GA = Goals against

                                     2018 Roster

Founders Cup
CANADIAN NATIONAL CHAMPIONSHIPS

External links
Regals Webpage
The Bible of Lacrosse
Unofficial OLA Page

Ontario Lacrosse Association teams
Sport in Guelph
Lacrosse clubs established in 1992
1992 establishments in Ontario